A Fixed Penalty Notice in the HKSAR is issued for minor offences such as smoking, littering, parking and allowing engines to idle.

History
Fixed penalty notices were first imagined in the Transport Act 1982 of British legislation.

The smoking ordinance was issued by Gabriel M. Leung in his capacity as Acting Secretary for Food and
Health in 2008.

References

Law of Hong Kong
Hong Kong legislation